"White Lies" is a single by German EDM duo Vize and German rock band Tokio Hotel, from the latter's upcoming seventh studio album 2001. It was released on 15 January 2021. Two remixes of the song were released later that year; one by German DJ NOØN on 2 April 2021, and the other by German DJ duo HBz on 7 May 2021. "White Lies" was used as the opening theme for Season 16 of Germany's Next Topmodel.

Lyric video
The lyric video contains various environments under a red/blue overlay with the lyrics appearing on the screen.

Music video
The music video stars all members of Tokio Hotel, plus DJ Johannes and Vitali from VIZE. Shot and photographed by Christoph Köstlin and Dennis Dirksen, and directed by Barış Aladağ, the video shows the members of Tokio Hotel and VIZE floating around with their instruments, with Bill singing the song. The colours shift from red to blue, to black, like a rave party setting.

During production of the video, Tokio Hotel shared photos of the band's videoshoot on their official Instagram page.

White Lies Cover Challenge
With the song becoming popular in the social media world, Tokio Hotel started the White Lies Cover Challenge, which is a social media competition where they would ask fans to create their own cover of the song in any genre on video and to submit it to them on Instagram, Facebook or Twitter by 4 April 2021 using the hashtag #WhiteLiesCoverChallenge.

The winning covers would then be used by the band in a fan video version of the song. This was uploaded to their official YouTube account on 15 April 2021.

Track listing

Charts

Weekly charts

Year-end charts

Certifications

Release history

References

External links
Official lyric video
Official music video

Tokio Hotel songs
2021 singles
German rock songs
German dance songs